Pierre-Denis Martin (1663 – 1742) was a French painter of historical subjects, battles, hunts, and architectural views, particularly of royal residences, such as the Palace of Versailles and the Château de Compiègne. He was also known as Martin the Younger (le jeune) or Martin des Gobelins (because he was employed at the Gobelins Manufactory).

Background
P.-D. Martin was born in Paris, and according to d'Argenville, he was the cousin of Jean-Baptiste Martin, while Pierre-Jean Mariette says he was  Martin's nephew and pupil. He is also said to have been the pupil of Adam François van der Meulen and the Parrocel.

Work
He produced a series of paintings at the Château de Choisy, which are now in the Versailles Museum.

The dictionary of artists by Bellier de la Chavignerie and Auvray incorrectly attributes several paintings by Pierre-Denis Martin in the Versailles Museum to Jean-Baptiste Martin.

Death
Pierre-Denis Martin died in Paris.

Gallery

References
Notes

Sources
 Bellier de la Chavignerie, Émile; Auvray, Louis (1882, 1885, 1887). Dictionnaire général des artistes de l'école française. Paris: Renouard. Vols. 1: A–L (1882), 2: M–Z (1885), and supplement (1887) at Google Books.
 Benezit, Emmanuel; et al. (2006). Benezit – Dictionary of Artists. Paris: Gründ. .

External links
 
 From Direction des Musées de France
 List of works at Joconde: Portail des collections des musées de France

1663 births
1742 deaths
17th-century French painters
French male painters
18th-century French painters
18th-century French male artists